The Samsung Galaxy S 4G LTE also known as the Droid Charge (Verizon), Galaxy S Aviator (U.S. Cellular) and Galaxy S Lightray 4G (MetroPCS, includes DyleTV), it was an Android smartphone manufactured by Samsung. It has a 1 GHz "Hummingbird" processor, front and rear cameras, and CDMA and 4G LTE radios. It was announced at CES 2011 under the name Samsung Galaxy S 4G LTE device. It is available from Verizon Wireless.

Specifications

Hardware 
The Samsung Galaxy S 4G LTE has the Samsung S5PC110 system-on-chip that is manufactured on a 45 nm process and combines 1 GHz ARM Cortex-A8 based CPU core with a PowerVR SGX540 GPU made by Imagination Technologies; the GPU supports OpenGL ES 1.1/2.0 and is capable of up to 90 million triangles per second. The CPU core, code-named "Hummingbird", was co-developed by Samsung and Intrinsity.

The Samsung Galaxy S 4G LTE uses Swype technology as well as the standard QWERTY input methods. 

The Samsung Galaxy S 4G LTE incorporates a rear-facing 8-megapixel camera as well as a front-facing 1.3-megapixel camera.

The Samsung Galaxy S 4G LTE uses a  Super AMOLED Plus touch screen covered by Gorilla Glass, a special crack and scratch resistant material. The screen is a standard RGB stripe display manufactured by Samsung. It has WVGA resolution (480x800 pixels resolution).

Software 
The Samsung Galaxy S 4G LTE runs on Android 2.2.1 Froyo with Samsung's user interface TouchWiz out of the box. In early June 2011, the EE4 update was released to fix some minor bugs within the device. In early December 2011, Android 2.3.6 Gingerbread is started to be pushed out to devices with the "EP4" update. Subsequent updates were codenamed "FP5" and "FP8". Gingerbread was the last Android version to appear on the Galaxy S 4G LTE ; Samsung never released never versions of Android stating that an update (with TouchWiz) would not fit on the Galaxy S 4G LTE 's ROM.

See also
 Galaxy Nexus
 List of Android devices

References

External links
 Samsung Galaxy S 4G LTE official website
 Samsung Droid Charge website (Verizon Wireless)

Android (operating system) devices
Samsung Galaxy
Mobile phones introduced in 2011
Discontinued smartphones
Samsung smartphones